Sophie Hedwig of Saxe-Merseburg (4 August 1660 - 2 August 1686), was a German noblewoman member of the House of Wettin and by marriage Duchess of Saxe-Saalfeld.

Born in Merseburg, she was a child of Christian I, Duke of Saxe-Merseburg and his wife Christiana of Schleswig-Holstein-Sonderburg-Glücksburg.

Life
In Merseburg on 18 February 1680 Sophie Hedwig married Johann Ernest, Duke of Saxe-Coburg-Saalfeld. Both belonged to the House of Wettin: she was a member of the Albertine line while her husband belonged to the Ernestine branch. Three years before (1677)  one of Sophie Hedwig's sisters, Christiane, married Christian, Duke of Saxe-Eisenberg, in turn one of Johann Ernest's older brothers, so probably this marriage was instrumental for her future wedding.

The union produced five children, of whom only two survive adulthood:

Christiane Sophie (b. Saalfeld, 14 June 1681 – d. Saalfeld, 3 June 1697).
Stillborn daughter (Saalfeld, 6 May 1682).
Christian Ernst, Duke of Saxe-Coburg-Saalfeld (b. Saalfeld, 18 August 1683 – d. Saalfeld, 4 September 1745).
Charlotte Wilhelmine (b. Saalfeld, 4 May 1685 – d. Hanau, 5 April 1767), married on 26 December 1705 to Philip Reinhard, Count of Hanau-Münzenberg.
Stillborn son (Saalfeld, 2 August 1686).

Sophie Hedwig died in childbirth in Saalfeld, two days before her twenty-six birthday. She was buried in the Johanniskirche, Saalfeld.

References

|-

1660 births
1686 deaths
House of Wettin
Deaths in childbirth
Daughters of monarchs